Sirens is an American metalcore band from Terre Haute, Indiana formed in 2011. They released their debut EP, entitled Spore, in June 2012, before releasing a remixed and remastered version of the EP via Imminence Records on November 13, 2012. In 2013, Sirens competed in the Ernie Ball Battle of the Bands, where they place first nationally amongst the fan vote. On June 18, 2013, Ernie Ball announced Sirens as a winner for Indianapolis's Warped Tour 2013. Sirens has since left Imminence Records.

On June 12, 2015, Sirens announced a new album titled Surge. Surge was released July 28, 2015.

Members
Current
 Joey Fenoglio – vocals (2011–present)
 Logan Pollaro – guitar (2014–present), bass (2011–2014)
 Zhea Erose – drums, electronics (2011–present)

Past
 Jordan Thralls – guitar (2011–2014)
 Jordan Caylor – guitar, vocals (2011-2014)
 Cody Butler – guitar (2015–2016)
 Luke Boismier - bass (2015–2017)

Discography

Studio albums
LP
 Surge (2015)
 "Surge"
 "Drift"
 "Drone"
 "Pendulous"
 "Ephyra"
 "Macroscopic"
 "Cloudbreak"
 "Unstable and Floating"
 "Swarm Dynamics"
 "Medusae"

EPs
 Spore (2012)
 "Drift"
 "Cloudbreak"
 "Unstable and Floating"
 "Music Box"
 "Propaganda"

Singles
 "Drone" (2013)
 "Pendulous (2014)
 "Swarm Dynamics (2015)

References

External links

2011 establishments in Indiana
Metalcore musical groups from Indiana
American progressive metal musical groups
Djent
Musical groups established in 2011
Musical groups from Indianapolis